Schizotheriines are one of the two subfamilies of the extinct family Chalicotheriidae, a group of herbivorous odd-toed ungulate (perissodactyl) mammals that lived from the Eocene to the Pleistoscene. The other clade is the Chalicotheriinae. Both clades had claws rather than hooves on their front feet, an adaptation understood as related to feeding. Schizotheriines also had claws on their hind feet. The fossils of both groups are found in environments that had trees and shrubs. While chalicotheriines developed very derived body forms, schizotheriines remained basically similar in shape to other perissodactyls such as horses and tapirs. Like most forest-dwelling ungulates, they had long necks and forelimbs longer than their hindlimbs. Schizotheriines had longer, higher-crowned cheek teeth than chalicotheriines, which indicates they typically fed on tougher vegetation. The sediments where their fossils are found show they also lived in a wider range of environments, from moist forests to drier woodland or savannah-like environments with trees. Perhaps for this reason, they became more widely distributed than chalicotheriines. Though chalicotheres likely evolved in Asia, schizotheriine fossils are also found in Africa and North America, which they reached by the Bering land bridge. The best-known schizotheriine genus is Moropus. The last survivor of the group was traditionally thought to be Nestoritherium, but it was found to actually be a member of Chalicotheriinae.

Analysis of dental microwear implies that most Miocene Schizotheriinae fed on leaves, fruit, bark and twigs. Their claws were likely used in a hook-like manner to pull down branches to bring these items within reach of the mouth, suggesting they lived as high browsers. Some paleontologists have suggested other uses for the claws, such as stripping bark from trees. Though the claws on the forefeet were long, they could be retracted, so the animals could walk normally on the sole of the foot. The claw-retraction mechanism was unique to schizotheriines, and different from the structure in cats. The broad base of the hind legs may have allowed schizotheriines to rear upright and brace themselves against a tree trunk in order to reach higher for food.

References

Further reading

 

 
Pleistocene extinctions
Miocene first appearances
Fossil taxa described in 1914
Taxa named by William Jacob Holland